Raj Kumar Pal (born 1 May 1998) is an Indian field hockey player who plays as a midfielder. He made his international debut for India in February 2020 at the 2020–21 Men's FIH Pro League.

References

External links
Raj Kumar Pal at Hockey India

1998 births
Living people
People from Ghazipur district
Indian male field hockey players
Field hockey players from Uttar Pradesh
People from Ghazipur